Peyrissac is a commune in the Corrèze department of Nouvelle-Aquitaine in central France.

Geography
Located on the Plateau de Millevaches in the Millevaches regional nature park,  Peyrissac is a commune of the Massif Central. It is situated along the course of the Bradascour river, a tributary of the Vézère.

History

Heraldry

Population

See also
Communes of the Corrèze department

References

Communes of Corrèze